is a flatland castle in Kyoto, Japan. The castle consists of two concentric rings (Kuruwa) of fortifications, the Ninomaru Palace, the ruins of the Honmaru Palace, various support buildings and several gardens.

It is one of the seventeen Historic Monuments of Ancient Kyoto which have been designated by UNESCO as a World Heritage Site.

History 

In 1601, Tokugawa Ieyasu, the founder of the Tokugawa shogunate, ordered all the feudal lords in western Japan to contribute to the construction of Nijō Castle, which was completed during the reign of Tokugawa Iemitsu in 1626. While the castle was being built, a portion of land from the partially abandoned Shinsenen Garden (originally part of the imperial palace and located south) was absorbed, and its abundant water was used in the castle gardens and ponds. Parts of Fushimi Castle, such as the main tower and the karamon, were moved here in 1625–26. Nijo Castle was built as the Kyoto residence of the Tokugawa shōguns. The Tokugawa shogunate used Edo as the capital city, but Kyoto continued to be the home of the Imperial Court. Kyoto Imperial Palace is located north-east of Nijō Castle.

The central keep, or tenshu, was struck by lightning and burned to the ground in 1750. In 1788, the Inner Ward was destroyed by a citywide fire. The site remained empty until it was replaced by a prince's residence transferred from the Kyoto Imperial Palace in 1893.

In 1867, the Ninomaru Palace, in the Outer Ward, was the stage for the declaration by Tokugawa Yoshinobu, returning the authority to the Imperial Court. In 1868 the Imperial Cabinet was installed in the castle. The palace became imperial property and was declared a detached palace. During this time, the Tokugawa hollyhock crest was removed wherever possible and replaced with the imperial chrysanthemum.

In 1939, the palace was donated to the city of Kyoto and opened to the public the following year. In the 21st century, typhoons have periodically caused sections of plaster to peel off the walls after exposure to rain and wind.

Fortifications 

Nijō Castle has two concentric rings of fortifications, each consisting of a wall and a wide moat. The outer wall has three gates while the inner wall has two. In the southwest corner of the inner wall, there are foundations of a five-story keep, destroyed by a fire in 1750. The inner walls surround the Inner Ward, which contain Honmaru ("Inner Ward") Palace with its garden. Ninomaru ("Second Ward") Palace, the kitchens, guard house and several gardens are located in the Outer Ward, between the two main rings of fortifications.

Ninomaru Palace 

The   consists of five connected separate buildings and is built almost entirely of Hinoki cypress. The decoration includes lavish quantities of gold leaf and elaborate wood carvings, intended to impress visitors with the power and wealth of the shōguns. The sliding doors and walls of each room are decorated with wall paintings by artists of the Kanō school.

The castle is an excellent example of social control manifested in architectural space. Low-ranking visitors were received in the outer regions of the Ninomaru, whereas high-ranking visitors were shown the more subtle inner chambers. Rather than attempt to conceal the entrances to the rooms for bodyguards (as was done in many castles), the Tokugawas chose to display them prominently. Thus, the construction lent itself to expressing intimidation and power to Edo-period visitors.

The building houses several different reception chambers, offices and the living quarters of the shōgun, where only female attendants were allowed. One of the most striking features of the Ninomaru Palace are the "nightingale floors" (uguisubari) in the corridors that make a chirping sound when walked upon. Some of the rooms in the castle also contained special doors where the shogun's bodyguard could sneak out to protect him.

The room sequence starting at the entrance is:
 Yanagi-no-ma (Willow Room), 
 Wakamatsu-no-ma (Young Pine Room)
 Tozamurai-no-ma (Retainers' Room) 
 Shikidai-no-ma (Reception Room) 
 Rōchu-no-ma (Ministers' Offices)
 Chokushi-no-ma (Imperial Messenger's Room)

The Ōhiroma (Great Hall) is the central core of the Ninomaru Palace and consists of four chambers:
 Ichi-no-ma (First Grand Chamber)
 Ni-no-ma (Second Grand Chamber) 
 San-no-ma (Third Grand Chamber) 
 Yon-no-ma (Fourth Grand Chamber)

as well as the Musha-kakushi-no-ma (Bodyguards' Chamber) and the Sotetsu-no-ma (Japanese fern-palm chamber).

The rear sections are the Kuroshoin (Inner Audience Chamber) and Shiroshoin (shōguns living quarters). The main access to the Ninomaru is through the karamon, a court and the mi-kurumayose or "honourable carriages approach".

Honmaru Palace 

The complex has four parts: living quarters, reception and entertainment rooms, entrance halls and kitchen area. The different areas are connected by corridors and courtyards. The architectural style is late Edo period.

Honmaru Palace was originally similar to Ninomaru Palace. The original structures were replaced by the present structures between 1893 and 1894, by moving one part of the former Katsura Palace within the Kyoto Imperial Enclosure (Kyoto Gyoen, the enclosure surrounding the Kyoto Imperial Palace) to the inner ward of Nijō Castle, as part of the systematic clearing of the disused residences and palaces in the Imperial Enclosure after the Imperial Court moved to Tokyo in 1869. In its original location the palace had 55 buildings, but only a small part was relocated. In 1928 the enthronement banquet of Emperor Hirohito was held here.

Gardens 

The castle area has several gardens and groves of cherry and Japanese plum trees. The Ninomaru garden was designed by the landscape architect and tea master Kobori Enshū. It is located between the two main rings of fortifications, next to the palace of the same name. The garden has a large pond with three islands and features numerous carefully placed stones and topiary pine trees.

The Seiryū-en garden is the most recent part of Nijō Castle. It was constructed in 1965 in the northern part of the complex, as a facility for the reception of official guests of Kyoto and as a venue for cultural events. Seiryū-en has two tea houses and more than 1,000 carefully arranged stones.

See also
List of Special Places of Scenic Beauty, Special Historic Sites and Special Natural Monuments
Historic Monuments of Ancient Kyoto (Kyoto, Uji and Otsu Cities)
List of National Treasures of Japan (residences)

Notes

References

External links 

 Satellite view at Google Maps
 Nijo Castle
 Japan-Guide.com

Ashikaga clan
Buildings and structures in Kyoto
Castles in Kyoto Prefecture
Gardens in Kyoto Prefecture
Historic Sites of Japan
Important Cultural Properties of Japan
National Treasures of Japan
Special Places of Scenic Beauty
Tokugawa clan
Tourist attractions in Kyoto
World Heritage Sites in Japan
Buildings and structures completed in 1626